Gary Wayne Serum (born October 24, 1956) is a retired Major League Baseball pitcher. He played two and half seasons at the major league level for the Minnesota Twins. He was signed by the Twins as an amateur free agent in 1975. Serum played his last professional season with the New York Yankees' Double-A Nashville Sounds and Triple-A Columbus Clippers in 1982.
Serum grew up in Alexandria, Minnesota and graduated from Alexandria Area High School.

References

External links

1956 births
Living people
Minnesota Twins players
Nashville Sounds players
Wisconsin Rapids Twins players
Toledo Mud Hens players
Elizabethton Twins players
Columbus Clippers players
Tacoma Twins players
Orlando Twins players
Major League Baseball pitchers
Baseball players from North Dakota
Sportspeople from Fargo, North Dakota
People from Alexandria, Minnesota